Richard Campeau may refer to:

 Richard Campeau (politician), Canadian politician
 Rychard Campeau, Canadian ice hockey player